Josip Šutalo (born 28 February 2000) is a Croatian professional footballer currently playing as a defender for Prva HNL club Dinamo Zagreb and the Croatia national team.

International career
Šutalo made his debut for Croatia national team on 10 June 2022 in a 1–0 victory over Denmark in the Nations League, having been named in the starting lineup. On 17 December 2022, he made his debut for Croatia at a major tournament in the 2–1 third place play-off victory over Morocco at the 2022 FIFA World Cup.

Career statistics

Club

Notes

International

Honours 
Croatia

 FIFA World Cup third place: 2022

References

External links
 

2000 births
Living people
People from Čapljina
Croats of Bosnia and Herzegovina
Association football central defenders
Bosnia and Herzegovina footballers
Croatian footballers
Croatia youth international footballers
Croatia international footballers
2022 FIFA World Cup players
GNK Dinamo Zagreb II players
GNK Dinamo Zagreb players
NK Istra 1961 players
First Football League (Croatia) players
Croatian Football League players